Neustadt-Glewe station is a railway station in the municipality of Neustadt-Glewe, located in the Ludwigslust-Parchim district in Mecklenburg-Vorpommern, Germany.

References

Railway stations in Mecklenburg-Western Pomerania
Buildings and structures in Ludwigslust-Parchim